The Hitachi small-type monorail is a straddle-type monorail built by Hitachi Rail for the use on the Sentosa Express. These trains are part of Hitachi Monorail line of ALWEG-based monorail. The trains were part of a project to replace Sentosa's previous aging monorail system. The trains are fully air-conditioned.

Design
Each train set has its own exterior colour scheme – green, orange, blue, purple, pink, yellow and red. All trains are for passenger service, except for the maintenance train.

The interior of the trains consist of colours green and orange. These cars have foldable seats that can make room for more standing space during periods of high usage. Passenger Information Display Systems in the form of LED Displays are installed above each door in all passenger service trains to supply route information. Each car has two wheelchair bays.

Operations and safety systems
Trains and platform screen doors were previously manually operated by train attendants; the trains utilised digital automatic train protection (ATP) to ensure trains keep a safe distance between each other and automatic train supervision (ATS) to provide the route setting for the train to travel.

With the upgrading to the wireless communications-based train control (CBTC) system in 2017, trains and platform screen doors are now operated automatically. 

Refurbishment and upgrades
The Vacuum Fluorescent Display (VFD) has been changed to a newer updated LED Displays with route information.

A signalling system upgrade was also upgraded to Communications-Based Train Control (CBTC). With the change in Signalling System, it allowed more trains to run on the network.

See also
 Hitachi Monorail
 Sentosa island
 Rail transport in Singapore
 Sentosa Monorail – a dismantled monorail system that used to ferry visitors around Sentosa from 1982 to 2005

References

External links
 Hitachi wins contract to develop "SENTOSA EXPRESS" for Sentosa Development Corporation — (press release)
 Monorail Society: Sentosa Express Construction Gallery
 Fact sheet for Sentosa Express

Alweg people movers
Railway lines opened in 2007
2007 establishments in Singapore
Bukit Merah
Express